The 1970–71 Idaho State Bengals men's basketball team represented Idaho State University during the  NCAA University Division basketball season. Led by fourth-year head coach Dan Miller, the Bengals played their home games on campus at the new ISU Minidome in Pocatello.

Senior guard Willie Humes averaged over 34 points per game and was again unanimously selected to the all-conference team.

Miller was dismissed after the season in March, succeeded by Jim Killingsworth, the head coach for seven seasons at Cerritos College in southern California, where he compiled a  record and led the Falcons to the 1968 California junior college championship.

References

External links
Sports Reference – Idaho State Bengals – 1970–71 basketball season
Idaho State Bengals men's basketball – Year by year results

Idaho State Bengals men's basketball seasons
Idaho State
Idaho State